In a chemical reaction, a reactant is considered to be in abundance if the quantity of that substance is high and virtually unchanged by the reaction.  Abundance differs from excess in that a reactant in excess is simply any reactant other than the limiting reagent; the amount by which a reactant is in excess is often specified, such as with terms like "twofold excess", indicating that there is twice the amount of reactant necessary for the limiting reagent to be completely reacted.  In this case, should the reaction go to completion, the quantity of the reactant in excess will have halved.

When performing kinetic or thermodynamic studies, it is often useful to have one or more reactants in abundance, as it allows their concentrations to be treated as constants (or parameters) rather than as variables.

References

Chemical kinetics